Mathew Samuel is a former managing editor of the Indian news magazine Tehelka. He is one of the founding members of the magazine, and as a special correspondent there, he instigated Tehelka's biggest corruption investigation, Operation West End. This sting operation led to the resignation of four senior ministers of the National Democratic Alliance (NDA) and nearly brought down the BJP-led national government in 2001. The top politicians and officials caught in the sting were later convicted by the court of law.

Career
Mathew Samuel was born in a Christian family in Pathanapuram, Kerala. He attended St. Stephens College Pathanapuram, was active in politics, and was the college union secretary. 

He worked in Delhi for Mangalam newspaper and Mid-Day for a short period. He later joined Tehelka as a staff reporter, and became managing editor in 2014. He has also worked in Delhi for the publication India Today, and for television channels NewsX, Live India and India TV. He is based in New Delhi. He resigned from Tehelka in February 2016 to start his own news venture, Narada News.

Operation West End

The sting was the brainchild of Mathew Samuel. He got the beginning of the story on a train journey in which one of his co-passengers turned out to be a supplier for Defence Canteens. The sting operation lasted for about eight months and revealed involvement of public figures in corruption. Samuel met with approximately 60 people, including arms dealers, and exposed corruption at high levels of power. The public figures involved were George Fernandes (Defence Minister), Bangaru Laxman (BJP president), Jaya Jaitly (president of the Samatha Party), R. K. Jain (treasurer of Samatha Party), R K Sharma (treasurer of RSS), General Manjith Singh Aluvalia, Major General P. S. K. Chowdhary, General R. K. Murge, General Satnam Singh, Brigadier Iqbal Singh, Colonel Anil Saigal, H. C. Panth, P. Sasi, and Surender Kumar Surekha, a kanpur based businessman

On July 30,2020,Special CBI judge Virender Bhat  awarded 4-year jail term to former Samata Party president Jaya  Jaitley, her former party colleague Gopal Pacherwal and Major General (rtd) S.P. Murgai.

There were 105 videotapes. Samuel alone shot 99 tapes; the rest were shot with his colleague.

Narada sting operations

Mathew Samuel is also credited for conducting the Narada sting operation and publishing it in the new website. naradanews.com.

References

External links 
 
CBI file case against tehelka scribe under OSA
 police protection for tehelka reporter in Kerala
Interview
 Tehelka editorial
 

Journalists from Kerala
Living people
1971 births
People from Kollam district
Indian editors
Indian publishers (people)